Kennedy High School is a public high school  located in Cedar Rapids, Iowa. Kennedy was founded in 1967. The building was dedicated by Senator Edward M. Kennedy, younger brother of the school's namesake President John F. Kennedy. The school's athletic teams are known as the Cougars. It is a part of the Cedar Rapids Community School District.

In addition to portions of Cedar Rapids, Kennedy High's boundary includes: Hiawatha, Palo, and most of Robins.

Academics
Kennedy offers 32 Advanced Placement classes, including five world language courses AP Chinese, French, German, Japanese, and Spanish. In 2019 Kennedy placed sixth on the Iowa AP Index, a ranking system developed by the University of Iowa's Belin-Blank Center. The Iowa AP Index recognizes AP participation among public and private high schools in Iowa.

Athletics
The Kennedy Cougars compete in the Mississippi Valley Conference in the following sports:

Cross Country
Volleyball
 1979 State Champions
Football
Basketball
 Boys' 2-time State Champions (1972, 1984)
Wrestling
Swimming
 Boys' 1981 State Champions
 Girls' 2-time State Champions (1978, 1981)
Track and Field
Golf
 Boys' 1991 State Champions
 Coed 1974 State Champions
Soccer
 Girls' 3-time State Champions
Softball
Baseball
 2010 Class 4A State Champions 
Tennis
Boys' 2008 Class 2A State Champions
 Girls' 1990 Class 2A State Champions
Bowling
Dance Team
2 time State Champions  (2001 lyrical, 2002 jazz)

The Cougars have won five consecutive Cedar Rapids Men's All-Sports Titles. The Cougars won the Girls State Soccer Championship in 2012 after upsetting top-ranked Ankeny in the finals.

Performing Arts
Kennedy varsity show choir is named Happiness, Inc. The first show choir west of the Mississippi, Happiness was named "America's Favorite Show Choir" by Parade Magazine in 2011. Happiness placed first in FAME National Show Choir Championship in 2003  and at the 2012 Show Choir Nationals in Nashville, Tennessee.  Kennedy's prep show choir is known as Protégé, and the all female show choir is known as Chanteurs, with each winning multiple awards for their divisions at several competitions over the years. Kennedy's band participated in the Chicago 2006 Heritage Festival.

Notable alumni
Salvatore Giunta - United States Army, veteran of the War in Afghanistan, and the first living recipient of the Medal of Honor since the Vietnam War
Shawn Sedlacek, former MLB player (Kansas City Royals)
Aaron Willis - Two-time IBJJF Pan American Champion

See also
 List of memorials to John F. Kennedy
 List of high schools in Iowa

Notes

External links
 Kennedy High School Homepage

Educational institutions established in 1967
Public high schools in Iowa
Schools in Cedar Rapids, Iowa
1967 establishments in Iowa
Monuments and memorials to John F. Kennedy in the United States
Schools in Linn County, Iowa